Pinelands may refer to:

Australia 
 Pinelands, Queensland, a locality in the Toowoomba Region
 Pinelands, Northern Territory, a suburb in City of Palmerston

South Africa 
 Pinelands, Cape Town, a suburb

United States 
 Pine Barrens (New Jersey)
 New Jersey Pinelands National Reserve
 Pinelands Regional School District, a school district in Tuckerton, New Jersey, USA
Pinelands Regional High School, a high school located in the aforementioned school district
 Plymouth Pinelands, a geographical region surrounding Plymouth, Massachusetts, USA

See also
 Pineland (disambiguation)
 Pine barrens